Sarga is a genus of flowering plants in the grass family Poaceae, native to Mexico, Central America, Africa, the Arabian Peninsula, India, Indonesia, New Guinea, and Australia. It was resurrected from Sorghum in 2003.

Species
The following species are accepted:
Sarga angusta 
Sarga intrans 
Sarga leioclada 
Sarga plumosa 
Sarga purpureosericea 
Sarga stipoidea 
Sarga timorensis 
Sarga trichoclada 
Sarga versicolor

References

Andropogoneae
Poaceae genera